Nepal Nag (19 September 1909 — 4 October 1978) was a prominent Bengali communist politician. He took active part in Indian independence movement.

Early life
Nag was born on 1909 in Tejgaon, Dhaka in British India. His real name is Shailesh Chandra Nag. His father's name was Suresh Chandra Nag.

Revolutionary movement
In 1923, Nag joined Leela Roy's Srisangha, a nationalist organisation of undivided Bengal. He participated in the revolutionary movement after passing IA. Nag was first arrested on 21 April 1932 and was sent to Deuli prison camp for seven years, wherel he took part in Communist consolidation and was attracted to the ideology of Marxism by a senior revolutionary, Rebati Barman. After release in 1938, he joined the Communist Party of India. After the Partition of India in 1947, he secretly led the East Pakistan Provincial Communist Party under the pseudonym "Rahman Bhai" from 1947 to 1972. He was the founder of the trade union movement of Narayanganj. Thereafter, Nag became the General Secretary of East Pakistan Provincial Communist Party and represented the party at the 1970 World Communist Conference in Moscow. He also represented the Communist Party of East Pakistan at the 22nd Congress of the Communist Party of Russia in 1971. He posthumously received the Friends of Liberation War Award in 2012 from the Bangladesh government.

References

1909 births
1978 deaths
People from Dhaka District
Pakistani politicians
Pakistani trade union leaders
Communist Party of Bangladesh politicians
Bangladeshi Marxists
Bangladeshi Hindus
Prisoners and detainees of British India